SS Norwich City was an oil-fired steam freighter powered by a triple expansion steam engine.

History
She was built in 1911 by William Gray & Company, Ltd., West Hartlepool, England, with engines by the company's Central Marine Engine Works.

On 23 or 24 April 1928 (sources differ), the ship ran into the Second Narrows Bridge in Vancouver, British Columbia, Canada, and lost her funnel and masts.

Wreck 
In November 1929, Norwich City, carrying a crew of 35, left Melbourne bound for Vancouver via Honolulu. During a storm on 29 November, the unladen freighter ran aground in darkness on the reef at the northwest end of the small central Pacific atoll known as Gardner Island. A fire broke out in the engine room, and all hands abandoned ship in darkness, having to make their way across the wide and dangerous coral reef being pounded by dangerous storm waves. In total, 11 men died. The survivors camped near collapsed structures from a late 19th-century coconut-planting project and were rescued after several days on the island.

The devastated wreck of the Norwich City was a prominent landmark on the reef for 70 years, though by 2007, only the ship's keel, engine, and two large tanks remained. By 2010, only the engine remained above water on the reef. In 2016, storm activity washed one of the two large tanks shoreward and the two-story engine was broken off and dropped over the edge of the reef into deep water.

See also
 Gardner Island hypothesis of Amelia Earhart's last days (organization claims radio transmission referred to SS Norwich City)

References

External links
Photo of SS Norwich City taken about twenty months before the shipwreck
Historical record of SS Norwich City
Photo of what was left of the wreckage in 2007
 http://tighar.org/Projects/Earhart/Archives/Documents/Norwich_City/NorwichCity.html Reports from the Board of Trade's Inquiry into the Wreck of the Norwich City

Steamships
Cargo ships of the United Kingdom
Shipwrecks in the Pacific Ocean
Archaeology of shipwrecks
1911 ships
Maritime incidents in 1928
Maritime incidents in 1929